Dale is a surname. Notable people with this name include:

Academics and scientists
Amy Marjorie Dale (1901-1967), British classicist
Angela Dale (born 1945) British statistician
Edgar Dale (1900–1985), US educationist
Henry Hallett Dale (1875–1968), English neuroscientist
James Charles Dale (1792–1872), English entomologist
Nellie Dale (1865-1967), British educator
Peter Dale, (born 1938) British poet and translator
Samuel Dale (1659–1739), English naturalist and physician

Entertainment industry professionals
Alan Dale (born 1947), New Zealand-born Australian actor
Cynthia Dale (born 1961), Canadian television dancer and actress
Darren Dale, Australian film and television producer
Esther Dale (1885–1961), American actress
Ian Anthony Dale (born 1978), American television actor
James Badge Dale (born 1978), American actor
Jennifer Dale (born 1956), Canadian television dancer and actress
Virginia Dale (1917–1994), American film actress

Musicians
Alan Dale (singer) (1926–2002), American singer
Benjamin Dale (1885–1943), English composer
Dick Dale (1937–2019), American surf-rock musician and songwriter

Felicia Dale, American folk music singer-songwriter
Jim Dale (born 1935), British singer, comedian and actor

Jimmy Dale (musician) (born 1935), Canadian arranger, conductor, composer, pianist, and organist 

Mickey Dale, (born 1968) keyboardist with English rock band Embrace

Politicians
Bob Dale (politician) (1875–1953) South Australian unionist and politician
Charles M. Dale (1893–1978), American jurist & politician
Iain Dale (born 1962), British conservative blogger
Porter H. Dale (1867–1933), US congressman and senator
Shana Dale (born 1964), American Deputy Administrator of NASA
Thomas Dale (born ~1570), British naval commander Virginia deputy-governor
Tony Dale (born 1969), American politician
William Dale (politician) (c. 1830–1904), politician and teetotaler in South Australia

Religious figures
John Dale (minister), American minister Church of Christ
Robert William Dale (1829–1895), English Nonconformist church leader
T. Pelham Dale (1821–1892), Anglo-Catholic ritualist clergyman

Sportspeople
 Dale (Middlesex cricketer), English cricketer, playing 1789-1809
Adam Dale (born 1968), Australian cricketer
Adrian Dale (born 1968), South African cricketer
Alexander Dale Oen (1985-2012), Norwegian swimmer
Carl Dale (born 1966), Welsh footballer
Carroll Dale (born 1938), American football wide receiver
DJ Dale (born 2000), American football player
Dominic Dale (born 1971), Welsh professional snooker player and commentator
Harry Dale (footballer) (1899–1985), English footballer
Jerry Dale (born 1933), American baseball umpire
Jimmy Dale (footballer) (born 1869), Scottish footballer
Johannes Dale (born 1997), Norwegian biathlete
John Dale (cricketer, born 1848) (1848–1895), English rower and cricketer
Mark Dale (born 1982), English cricketer
Roland Dale (born 1927), American football player
 Stacey Dales (born 1979), Canadian basketball player and sportscaster

Others
Arch Dale (1882-1962), political cartoonist
David Dale (1739–1806), Scottish industrialist & philanthropist
George Dale (died 1934), American executed murderer
Louise Boyd Dale (1913-1967), noted philatelist.
Richard Dale (1756–1826), US naval officer
Robert Dale (1812–1853), European explorer of Australia
T. Lawrence Dale (1884–1959), English architect

Fictional characters
Alan-a-Dale, minstrel from the Robin Hood legend
 Philip F. "Duckie" Dale, a character in Pretty in Pink.

See also
Dale (given name)
Dale (disambiguation) for other uses
Dahl or Dahle, surname with a similar spelling

References

English-language surnames